In organic chemistry, syn- and anti-addition are different ways in which substituent molecules can be added to an alkene or alkyne. The concepts of syn and anti addition are used to characterize the different reactions of organic chemistry by reflecting the stereochemistry of the products in a reaction. 

The type of addition that occurs depends on multiple different factors of a reaction, and is defined by the final orientation of the substituents on the parent molecule. Syn and anti addition are related to Markovnikov's rule for the orientation of a reaction, which refers to the bonding preference of different substituents for different carbons on an alkene or alkyne. In order for a reaction to follow Markovnikov's rule, the intermediate carbocation of the mechanism of a reaction must be on the more-substituted carbon, allowing the substituent to bond to the more-stable carbocation and the more-substituted carbon.

Syn addition is the addition of two substituents to the same side (or face) of a double bond or triple bond, resulting in a decrease in bond order but an increase in number of substituents. Generally the substrate will be an alkene or alkyne. An example of syn addition would be the oxidation of an alkene to a diol by way of a suitable oxidizing agent such as osmium tetroxide, or potassium permanganate, .

Anti addition is in direct contrast to syn addition.  In anti addition, two substituents are added to opposite sides (or faces) of a double bond or triple bond, once again resulting in a decrease in bond order and increase in number of substituents. The classical example of this is bromination (any halogenation) of alkenes. An anti addition reaction results in a trans-isomer of the products, as the substituents are on opposite faces of the bond.

Depending on the substrate double bond, addition can have different effects on the molecule. After addition to a straight-chain alkene such as ethene, the resulting alkane will rapidly and freely rotate around its single sigma bond under normal conditions (i.e. room temperature). Thus whether substituents are added to the same side (syn) or opposite sides (anti) of a double can usually be ignored due to free rotation. However, if chirality or the specific absolute orientation of the substituents needs to be taken into account, knowing the type of addition is significant. Unlike straight-chain alkenes, cycloalkene syn addition allows stable addition of substituents to the same side of the ring, where they remain together. The cyclic locked ring structure prevents free rotation.

Syn elimination and anti elimination are the reverse processes of syn and anti addition. These result in a new double bond, such as in Ei elimination.

Reactions and their addition type

References

External links 
 

Addition reactions
Stereochemistry